Paul Feasey (4 May 1933 – January 2012) was an English professional footballer who played as a centre half.

Career
Born in Hull, Feasey played for York Railway Institute, Hull City and Goole Town. He was also player-manager at Goole Town.

Later life and death
Feasey died in January 2012, at the age of 78, after suffering from dementia.

References

1933 births
2012 deaths
Footballers from Kingston upon Hull
English footballers
York Railway Institute A.F.C. players
Hull City A.F.C. players
Goole Town F.C. players
Goole Town F.C. managers
English Football League players
Association football defenders
English football managers